Plato's number is a number enigmatically referred to by Plato in his dialogue the Republic (8.546b). The text is notoriously difficult to understand and its corresponding translations do not allow an unambiguous interpretation. There is no real agreement either about the meaning or the value of the number. It also has been called the "geometrical number" or the "nuptial number" (the "number of the bride"). The passage in which Plato introduced the number has been discussed ever since it was written, with no consensus in the debate. As for the number's actual value, 216 is the most frequently proposed value for it, but 3,600 or 12,960,000 are also commonly considered.  

An incomplete list of authors who mention or discourse about includes the names of Aristotle, Proclus for antiquity; Ficino and Cardano during the Renaissance; Zeller, Friedrich Schleiermacher, Paul Tannery and Friedrich Hultsch in the 19th century and further new names are currently added.

Further in the Republic (9.587b) another number is mentioned, known as the "Number of the Tyrant".

Plato's text
Great lexical and syntactical differences are easily noted between the many translations of the Republic. Below is a typical text from a relatively recent translation of Republic 546b–c:
Now for divine begettings there is a period comprehended by a perfect number, and for mortal by the first in which augmentations dominating and dominated when they have attained to three distances and four limits of the assimilating and the dissimilating, the waxing and the waning, render all things conversable and commensurable [546c] with one another, whereof a basal four-thirds wedded to the pempad yields two harmonies at the third augmentation, the one the product of equal factors taken one hundred times, the other of equal length one way but oblong,-one dimension of a hundred numbers determined by the 
rational diameters of the pempad lacking one in each case, or of the irrational lacking two; the other dimension of a hundred cubes of the triad. And this entire geometrical number is determinative of this thing, of better and inferior births.

The 'entire geometrical number', mentioned shortly before the end of this text, is understood to be Plato's number. The introductory words mention (a period comprehended by) 'a perfect number' which is taken to be a reference to Plato's perfect year mentioned in his Timaeus (39d). The words are presented as uttered by the muses, so the whole passage is sometimes called the 'speech of the muses' or something similar. Indeed, Philip Melanchthon compared it to the proverbial obscurity of the Sibyls. Cicero famously described it as 'obscure'  but others have seen some playfulness in its tone.

Interpretations

Shortly after Plato's time his meaning apparently did not cause puzzlement as Aristotle's casual remark attests. Half a millennium later, however, it was an enigma for the Neoplatonists, who had a somewhat mystic penchant and wrote frequently about it, proposing geometrical and numerical interpretations. Next, for nearly a thousand years, Plato's texts disappeared and it is only in the Renaissance that the enigma briefly resurfaced. During the 19th century, when classical scholars restored original texts, the problem reappeared. Schleiermacher interrupted his edition of Plato for a decade while attempting to make sense of the paragraph. Victor Cousin inserted a note that it has to be skipped in his French translation of Plato's works. In the early 20th century, scholarly findings suggested a Babylonian origin for the topic.

Most interpreters argue that the value of Plato's number is 216 because it is the cube of 6, i.e. , which is remarkable for also being the sum of the cubes for the Pythagorean triple (3, 4, 5): .

Such considerations tend to ignore the second part of the text where some other numbers and their relations are described. The opinions tend to converge about their values being 480,000 and 270,000 but there is little agreement about the details. Instead of multiplication some interpretations consider the sum of these factors: .

Other values that have been proposed include:
, by Otto Weber (1862).
, a perfect number proposed by Cardano. It is known that such numbers can be decomposed into the sum of consecutive odd cubes, so .
, by Marsilio Ficino (1496).
, by Jacob Friedrich Fries (1823).

See also 
 Euler's sum of powers conjecture

References

Further reading
 Donaldson J., "On Plato's Number", Proceedings of the Philological Society, vol.1, iss. 8, p. 81-90, April 7, 1843 
 Adam J., The nuptial number of Plato: its solution and significance, London: C.J. Clay and Sons, 1891.
Laird, A.G., Plato's Geometrical Number and the Comment of Proclus, The Collegiate Press, George Banta Publishing Company, Menasha, Wisconsin. 1918
Diès A., Le Nombre de Platon: Essai d'exégèse et d'Histoire, Paris 1936 
Allen M., Nuptial Arithmetic: Marsilio Ficino's Commentary on the Fatal Number in Book VIII of Plato's Republic UCLA 1994
Dumbrill R., Four Mathematical Texts from the Temple Library of Nippur: a source for Plato's number'', ARANE  1 (2009): 27-37

External links
 Five translations of Rep. 8.546 and 9.587
 
 Ramanujan And The Cubic Equation 33 + 43 + 53 = 63 
 Math world : Diophantine Equation--3rd Powers
 Sum of Consecutive Cubes Equals a Cube

Integers
Dialogues of Plato
Greek mathematics